Alpine skiing events at the 2007 Winter Universiade were held in Bardonecchia, Italy, from January 18 to 24, 2007. Downhill competitions were cancelled.

Men's events

Women's events

Medal table

Detailed results

Men's giant slalom

References

Sources 
 Full alpine skiing results

2007 Winter Universiade
Winter Universiade
2007